Cometochus guadeloupensis is a species of beetle in the family Cerambycidae, the only species in the genus Cometochus.

References

Acanthocinini